The Haufe Buzzer 2 is an American high-wing, strut-braced single-seat motor glider that was designed and constructed by Walter Haufe.

Design and development
After Haufe's earlier Buzzer was deemed less than successful, due to the insufficiently reliable Nelson Aircraft engine, Haufe retired that design and designed a new aircraft, which became the Buzzer 2. Intended to be a cross between a conventional sailplane and a light aircraft the aircraft was built with a  wing span and has a 16:1 glide ratio.

The Buzzer 2 is constructed with a welded steel tube fuselage and a wooden wing, all covered with doped aircraft fabric covering. The relatively low 8:1 aspect ratio wing uses a single spar and is supported by a single lift strut. The wing employs a modified NACA 2412 airfoil. The landing gear is a fixed monowheel and two wing-mounted outrigger wheels that support the wing during taxiing. The engine is a Curtiss snowmobile engine that turns at a maximum rpm of 6000, powering the propeller through an oil-immersed 2:1 chain reduction drive, giving a propeller speed of 3000 rpm.

Only one Buzzer 2 was constructed.

Operational history
Haufe reported that the aircraft uses  to take-off and climbs at about 500 feet per minute (2.5 m/s). The aircraft was still on the US Federal Aviation Administration registry in July 2011, registered in the Experimental - Amateur-built category.

Specifications (Buzzer 2)

See also

References

1970s United States sailplanes
Homebuilt aircraft